Calais-Fréthun station (French: Gare de Calais-Fréthun) is an SNCF international railway station in the suburbs of Calais, France. It is one of four stations serving the town; the others are Calais-Ville in the town centre, Fontinettes in the suburbs, and Beau Marais in the suburbs.

The station has four platforms, two on the high-speed line for Eurostar services, and two for SNCF TER Hauts-de-France regional services. The TER platforms are also used by some TGV long-distance services.

TGV
The TGV stops here on journeys from Lille-Europe to Calais, Boulogne and Rang-du-Fliers-Verton-Berck, and Paris.

TER Hauts-de-France

The local trains are run by TER Hauts-de-France which covers the region. The station is served by regional trains to Calais, Boulogne, Arras, Amiens and Lille.

Eurostar
Calais-Fréthun is the first station on the continental side of the Eurostar route and passengers can alight here to connect onto the SNCF or LGV Nord services.  three services a day called in each direction travelling between London and Brussels via Lille-Europe. However, these were suspended in 2020 as a result of the Coronavirus pandemic, and as of Autumn 2022 there is as yet no date for their resumption.

After the 'Additional Protocol to the Sangatte Protocol' was signed by France and the United Kingdom on 29 May 2000, juxtaposed controls were set up in the station. Eurostar passengers travelling to the UK clear exit checks from the Schengen Area (carried out by the French Border Police) as well as UK entry checks (conducted by the UK Border Force) in the station before boarding their train.

Notes

References

External links 

 

Railway stations in Pas-de-Calais
Railway stations served by Eurostar
Railway stations in France opened in 1993
Station
French railway stations with juxtaposed controls